Seesaw, is a 1996 novel by English author Deborah Moggach, first published in 1996 by Heinemann and recommended in OUP's Good Fiction Guide.

Plot introduction
Hannah, the seventeen-year-old daughter of upper middle class Morris and Val Price, is kidnapped with a half-million-pound ransom. The novel focuses on both the Price family and the kidnappers in the time leading up to the abduction. The book also focuses on the relationships between Jon and Eva, the two kidnappers, and Hannah as well as what happens to all characters following her release.

Television adaptation
Deborah Moggach also wrote the script for a three-part television adaptation of the novel, first broadcast in March 1998 on ITV.

References

External links
 
 

1996 British novels
Novels about child abduction
English novels
Heinemann (publisher) books
Novels by Deborah Moggach
Novels set in London